Chungju Hummel Football Club was a South Korean professional football club based in Chungju of Chungcheongbuk-do province. The club was based in Icheon from 2006 to 2007, and prior to that in Uijeongbu. Chungju Hummel played in the K League between 2013 and 2016, but was dissolved after the 2016 season.

Club name history
1999: Founded as Hummel Korea FC
2003: Renamed Uijeongbu Hummel FC
2006: Renamed Icheon Hummel FC
2008: Renamed Nowon Hummel FC
2010: Renamed Chungju Hummel FC

Managers

Records

Key
Tms. = Number of teams
Pos. = Position in league

Crest

See also
List of football clubs in South Korea
Hummel International

References

External links

 
Korea National League clubs
K League 2 clubs
Sport in North Chungcheong Province
Chungju
Association football clubs established in 1999
Association football clubs disestablished in 2016
1999 establishments in South Korea
2016 disestablishments in South Korea